= Philipp R. Heck =

Research director

Professor Philipp R. Heck is senior director of research at the Field Museum.
